James Building may refer to:

Madison Public Library and the James Building, Madison, New Jersey, listed on the National Register of Historic Places in Morris County, New Jersey
James Building (Summerton, South Carolina), listed on the National Register of Historic Places in Clarendon County, South Carolina
James Building (Chattanooga, Tennessee), listed on the National Register of Historic Places in Hamilton County, Tennessee